October (Arabic: اكتوبر) is a political magazine published in Cairo, Egypt. It is one of the state-owned publications in the country.

History and profile
October was established by Dar Al Maarif group in 1976. The first issue appeared on 31 October that year. It is a political and social magazine published by Dar Al Maarif group weekly on Saturdays. The company is owned by the Egyptian government and is based in Cairo.

Anis Mansour, an Egyptian writer, was the first editor-in-chief of the magazine  who held the post for a long period. Ismail Montassar also served as the editor-in-chief of the weekly. On 28 June 2014 Hassan Abu Taleb became the editor-in-chief of October. In September 2020 Muhammad Amin Ali Al Sayed was named as the editor-in-chief.

During the editorship of Anis Mansour the magazine published the articles by Israeli writers between 1979 and 1981. 

October sold 120,000 copies in 2000.

See also
 List of magazines in Egypt

References

External links

1976 establishments in Egypt
Arabic-language magazines
Magazines established in 1976
Magazines published in Cairo
Political magazines published in Egypt
State media
Weekly magazines published in Egypt